São Gonçalo do Amarante is a municipality in the state of Rio Grande do Norte in the Northeast region of Brazil.

Governador Aluizio Alves International Airport, the new airport that serves the metropolitan area of Natal, was opened in 2014 and is located in the municipality.

See also
List of municipalities in Rio Grande do Norte

References

Municipalities in Rio Grande do Norte